Pustynya is a rural locality (a village) in Gorodishchenskoye Rural Settlement, Nyuksensky District, Vologda Oblast, Russia. The population was 151 as of 2002. There are 2 streets.

Geography 
Pustynya is located 58 km southwest of Nyuksenitsa (the district's administrative centre) by road. Khokhlovo is the nearest rural locality.

References 

Rural localities in Nyuksensky District